Lampromicra aerea is an Australian species of jewel bug in the family Scutelleridae.

References

Scutelleridae
Insects described in 1892
Insects of Australia